Sycophant Records was a Nottingham based Independent label that published its first vinyl single release in 1990 for a local band called Meatfly. This release followed with more signings and releases from the likes of Force Fed, Skink, Pitchshifter, and the Scum Pups, to name but a few.

Sycophant Records  was no stranger to chart success as it was while with Sycophant Records, the Leicester-based band Scum Pups released their first 'mini' album Babykill, which held No.17 in the Melody Maker indie album charts, during March 1992.

References

External links
 DISCOGS list of bands

British independent record labels